The Anglican Diocese of Ho  is a Ghanaian diocese of the Church of the Province of West Africa, a member church of the worldwide Anglican Communion.   The current bishop is Matthias Mededues-Badohu.

References

Anglican dioceses in Ghana
Dioceses of the Church of the Province of West Africa
Dioceses in Ghana
Anglican bishops of Ho